Turritella ligar, common name : the Ligar screw shell, is a species of sea snail, a marine gastropod mollusk in the family Turritellidae.

Description
The shell grows to a length of 90 mm

Distribution
This species is distributed in the Atlantic Ocean along Senegal, Guinea and Gabon.

References

 Deshayes, G. P., 1843, Anim. S. Vert. 9: 261
 Bernard, P.A. (Ed.) (1984). Coquillages du Gabon [Shells of Gabon]. Pierre A. Bernard: Libreville, Gabon. 140, 75 plates pp

External links
 

Turritellidae
Gastropods described in 1843